Anderson University School of Theology is the graduate theological school affiliated with the Church of God (Anderson). It is a part of  Anderson University and receives students from Azusa Pacific University, Bay Ridge Christian College, Gardner College, Mid-America Christian University, Warner Pacific College, Warner University, and other schools.

Academics
The school is mainly associated with the Wesleyan-Holiness tradition. It is an institution accredited by the Association of Theological Schools, and grants the following degrees:
Doctor of Ministry (D. Min.)
Master of Divinity (M.Div.)
Master of Theological Studies (M.T.S.)
Master of Arts in Intercultural Service (M.A.I.S.)
an online Master of Arts in Christian Ministries (M.A.C.M.).

History
The school was established in 1917 for the training of ministers in the Church of God (Anderson).

References

External links

Seminaries and theological colleges in Indiana
Universities and colleges affiliated with the Church of God (Anderson, Indiana)
Educational institutions established in 1950
Buildings and structures in Anderson, Indiana
Anderson University (Indiana)
Education in Madison County, Indiana
1950 establishments in Indiana